Boroughmuir High School is a non-denominational secondary school in Edinburgh, Scotland.

Buildings 
It was founded in 1904, and located at 22–24 Warrender Park Crescent, overlooking Bruntsfield Links, in a building designed by John Alexander Carfrae,  and remembered by Muriel Spark as 'the school on the links'. Built as Boroughmuir School, the building became James Gillespies in 1913 when the new Boroughmuir  on Viewforth was opened. After the new Gillespie's was opened the building  became Boroughmuir again as the  'Junior School' housing first  and second years. The building on the links is now University of Edinburgh student residences.

The school moved to a site at 26 Viewforth, also designed by Carfrae, from 1913 to 2018. Built as a ‘higher grade’ school, the building was designed to accommodate over 1200 pupils in 40 classrooms. It  was a large '8 block' centred around two quads (with a gymnasium at the lower ground floor), the perimeter corridor and surrounding classrooms had large tripartite windows and corridor windows facing the 'quad'. Additional wings, dining halls, glazed roofs and mezzanine floors  were added later as the school struggled for space The school also used nearby St Oswalds Hall as an annex.

In June 2018 the school moved to the new building at 111 Viewforth in Fountainbridge on the site of a demolished brewery. The new building was named the Building of the Year by Edinburgh Architectural Association, and also won the RIAS Award 2018 and RIBA Award for Scotland.

Catchment area 
Its catchment area is in the south side of the city, and includes Bruntsfield, Buckstone, and South Morningside Primary Schools.

Achievements 
In 2011 Boroughmuir's exam results were the fourth best state school results in Scotland. Boroughmuir High School was also awarded the high achievement of State School of the Year in 2012 and 2018 by the Sunday Times Newspaper.

Houses 

Each pupil is assigned to a house named after streets surrounding the school – Leamington (yellow), Viewforth (green), Hartington (blue), Westhall (Red) and Montpelier. (Purple). The houses Bruntsfield and Montpelier were removed by David Dempster in 2013 and their remaining members were distributed among the remaining houses. Montpelier was recreated in 2018 to cope with an influx of new pupils, however this addition to the school was rather controversial and received a lot of backlash from pupils and staff. This resulted in pupils creating a petition to undo the addition of the house, this petition received 200+ signatures but ultimately failed after a meeting with head teacher David Dempster. Bruntsfield was also recreated in 2022, however the only classes affected were PSE.

History 
The school was opened  by the Secretary of State for Scotland, Thomas McKinnon Wood in 1914.  At the ceremony the Secretary of State was heckled by a member of the Women's Suffrage Movement, according to reports "an elderly lady seized the opportunity and made her way to the front of the audience, producing a small bag of flour from her muff and, as she threw it on Mr McKinnon Wood, she asked “Why do you torture women?” (Evening News 19 January 1914).

Lewis Romanis served as headteacher for 16 years from 1967 to 1982. He was succeeded by T.W. Dalgleish who headed the school until 2000.

The new school building was opened by Minister for Higher and Further Education and Science, Shirley-Anne Somerville accompanied by Councillor Adam McVey, Leader of the City of Edinburgh Council

War memorial 
Three volumes of the Boroughmuir High School Magazine including the Roll of Honour names of pupils who served and died in WW1 were digitised as part of the  University of Oxford 'lest we forget' project in 2018 and can be viewed online

Notable alumni

 Douglas Allan (geologist and director of the Royal Scottish Museum)
 Tommy Armour (golfer)
 Angus Beith (footballer currently playing for Hearts)
Ronnie Browne (founding member of The Corries)
Donald Campbell (poet) 
 Dale Carrick (footballer who currently plays for Airdrieonians F.C.)
 Annette Crosbie (actress)
William Cochran (physicist)
Neil Cochrane (rugby player)
Kayus Bankole (musician in Young Fathers)
Willie Duff (footballer)
Jim Fleming MBE, =International Referee
Ncuti Gatwa (actor, fourteenth Doctor Who)
Christine Grahame (Scottish National Party politician)
Richard Henderson (Nobel Prize-winning biologist)
Drew Hendry (Scottish National Party politician)
Robin M. Hochstrasser (scientist known for his work on molecular spectroscopy)
Ally Massaquoi (musician in Young Fathers)
William Matheson (Scottish Gaelic scholar)
Neve McIntosh (actress)
Pollyanna McIntosh (actress)
Graham Simpson Murray (industrial chemist)
Bill Noble (rugby player and Highland Games athlete)
Lesley Orr (theologian)
Bill Rae (journalist)
Scott Robinson (footballer who currently plays for East Fife)
Lewis Smith (fencer)
Sarah Smith (journalist)
Edward Stratton (artist)
Tom Palmer (England national rugby union team player)
Scott Robinson (footballer)
Ken Ross (rugby player)
George Taylor (botanist and director of Royal Botanic Garden Edinburgh)
Alexander Trotman (CEO of Ford Motor Company)
Harry Wattie (footballer)
Fraser Woodburn (university administrator)

Former teachers 

 William Bremner (educationalist)
 Peter Comrie (mathematician)
 Tam Dalyell (Labour Party politician)
 Robin Harper (Green Party politician)
 Bill Henderson (publisher)
 George Robin Henderson (mathematician)
 Fraser Henderson (Edinburgh Corporation official)
 Sorely MacLean (poet)
 Martin O'Neill (Labour Party politician)
 Samuel Robin Spark (artist)
Anum Qaisar (Scottish National Party politician)

References

External links
Boroughmuir Awards 
Official Site
Boroughmuir High School – Scottish Schools Online

Secondary schools in Edinburgh
Category B listed buildings in Edinburgh
Educational institutions established in 1904
1904 establishments in Scotland